Tumor necrosis factor receptor superfamily member 27 is a protein that in humans is encoded by the EDA2R gene.

EDA-A1 and EDA-A2 are two isoforms of ectodysplasin that are encoded by the anhidrotic ectodermal dysplasia (EDA) gene. Mutations in EDA give rise to a clinical syndrome characterized by loss of hair, sweat glands, and teeth. The protein encoded by this gene specifically binds to EDA-A2 isoform. This protein is a type III transmembrane protein of the TNFR (tumor necrosis factor receptor) superfamily, and contains 3 cysteine-rich repeats and a single transmembrane domain but lacks an N-terminal signal peptide. Multiple alternatively spliced transcript variants have been found for this gene, but some variants lack sufficient support.

References

Further reading

External links
 

TNF receptor family